Podgaj  is a village in the administrative district of Gmina Paradyż, within Opoczno County, Łódź Voivodeship, in central Poland.

References

Villages in Opoczno County